Soodevahe may refer to several places in Estonia:

Soodevahe, Harju County, village in Rae Parish, Harju County
Soodevahe, Saare County, village in Torgu Parish, Saare County